Scoria is a pyroclastic, highly vesicular, dark-colored volcanic rock that was ejected from a volcano as a molten blob and cooled in the air to form discrete grains or clasts. It is typically dark in color (generally dark brown, black or purplish-red), and basaltic or andesitic in composition. Scoria is relatively low in density as a result of its numerous macroscopic ellipsoidal vesicles, but in contrast to pumice, all scoria has a specific gravity greater than 1 and sinks in water. 

The holes or vesicles form when gases that were dissolved in the magma come out of solution as it erupts, creating bubbles in the molten rock, some of which are frozen in place as the rock cools and solidifies. Scoria may form as part of a lava flow, typically near its surface, or as fragmental ejecta (lapilli, blocks and bombs), for instance in Strombolian eruptions that form steep-sided scoria cones. Most scoria is composed of glassy fragments and may contain phenocrysts. Analysis of scoria found in Yemen showed that it was mainly composed of volcanic glass with a few zeolites (e.g., clinoptilolite). The word scoria comes from the Greek σκωρία, skōria, rust. The term cinder is now considered to be synonymous and interchangeable with the term scoria, and scoria is the preferred term used in the scientific literature.

Eruption of scoria frequently form volcanic cones, called either cinder cones or scoria cones. Prior to the 1980s, neither color nor composition was typically a part of the definition and a size range of the particles, e.g.  in diameter, was usually specified. During the 1980s, the size range disappeared from the definition and a requirement that scoria be black or reddish in color, mafic in composition, or combination of both was added.

Comparisons
Scoria differs from pumice, another vesicular volcanic rock, in having larger vesicles and thicker vesicle walls, and hence is denser. The difference is probably the result of lower magma viscosity, allowing rapid volatile diffusion, bubble growth, coalescence, and bursting.

Formation
 
As rising magma encounters lower pressures, dissolved gases are able to exsolve and form vesicles. Some of the vesicles are trapped when the magma chills and solidifies. Vesicles are usually small, spheroidal and do not impinge upon one another; instead, they open into one another with little distortion.

Volcanic cones of scoria can be left behind after eruptions, usually forming mountains with a crater at the summit. An example is Maungarei in Auckland, New Zealand, which like Te Tatua-a-Riukiuta in the south of the same city has been extensively quarried. Quincan, a unique form of Scoria, is quarried at Mount Quincan in Far North Queensland, Australia.

Uses

Scoria has several useful characteristics that influence how it is used. It is somewhat porous, has a high surface area and strength for its weight, and often has striking colours. Consequently, it is often used in landscaping and drainage works. It is also commonly used in gas barbecue grills.

Scoria can be used for high-temperature insulation. It is also used on oil well sites to limit mud problems resulting from heavy truck traffic.

The quarry of Puna Pau on Rapa Nui/Easter Island was the source of a red-coloured scoria which the Rapanui people used to carve the pukao (or topknots) for their distinctive moai statues, and even to carve some moai themselves.

It is also used as a traction aid on ice- and snow-covered roads.

Scoria is mined and used for a variety of purposes. It commonly mined for use as loose construction aggregate in Europe, the Southwestern United States, and Japan. Another major use of cinders is in manufacture of concrete and cinder blocks. In fact, the widespread use of cinders as construction aggregates by ancient Romans was one of earliest industrial uses of volcanic rocks.

Because of its high strength, high angles of internal friction, and with good insulating properties, scoria is also used in the construction of flexible, long-lasting roadbeds. Because of insulating properties of scoria, such roadbeds protect the ground beneath them from extreme temperatures, and the associated deformation. Also, it can be used to minimize the effect of annual frost heave and permafrost on roads.

Scoria has horticultural uses. Because it can hold water in its vesicles and in the pore space between grains in aggregates, it is used to improve the capacity of soils surrounding plants to hold moisture. When sorted to specific sizes, it is also an effective barrier for tunneling pests, such as termites. Its ragged surfaces allow it to be tightly packed and interlocked enough such that termites and other pests cannot fit between individual particles.

See also

Igneous rock

References

External links

Volcanic rocks
Glass in nature
Igneous petrology
Tephra